Radar, Anti-Aircraft, or simply AA radar for short, was a classification system for British Army radars introduced in 1943 and used into the 1960s when these systems were replaced by missiles with their own integral radar systems. The classification included subcategories, Number 1 through 8, as well as the many individual systems which were assigned Marks.

Some of the Army radars pre-date the introduction of this classification system and had their own nomenclature that tended to remain in use even after they officially received new names. Notable among these are the Gun Laying and Searchlight Control categories. Additionally, equipment introduced after the classification system often have rainbow codes that they are well known by. Some were also used by the Royal Air Force and thus also had an AMES number.

Number 1
AA Number 1 was assigned to the early gun laying radars operating in the 1.5 m VHF band. They were almost always referred to by their original name, GL Mk. I radar. The microwave-frequency systems that replaced them were assigned Number 3. There were three entries in the Number 1 classification:

 AA No. 1 Mark 1 - GL Mk. I
 AA No. 1 Mark 1* - GL Mk. I*, a slightly upgraded version of the original
 AA No. 1 Mark 2 - GL Mk. II

Number 2
AA Number 2 was assigned to the existing Searchlight Control radars. There were nine entries, Mark 1 through Mark 9, which were identical to the original Marks of the original SLC category and differed only in their mounting systems. The SLC concept was already falling from use when the new naming system was introduced, and they were generally not referred to by their new names.

Number 3
AA Number 3 collected a wide variety of microwave-frequency gun laying radars, mostly following the Marks of the earlier Gun Laying category. This was one of the few categories that was used extensively in the post-war era, and thus one of the few that contains entries without a former GL name. There were eight entries:

 AA No. 3 Mark 1 - GL Mk. III(C), the Canadian-designed version of Mk. III.
 AA No. 3 Mark 2 - GL Mk. III(B), the UK-designed version of Mk. III. Sub-versions /1 through /5.
 AA No. 3 Mark 3 - Expedient portable AA radar based on the SLC electronics. Also known as "Baby Maggie".
 AA No. 3 Mark 4 - Early versions of what would become AA No. 3 Mk. 7. Also known as "GLAXO".
 AA No. 3 Mark 5 - UK name for US-built SCR-584 used from 1944 onwards.
 AA No. 3 Mark 6 - Post-war Canadian lock-follow design, not taken into service.
 AA No. 3 Mark 7 - Post-war version of AA No. 3 Mk. 4, standard AA radar into the 1960s.
 AA No. 3 Mark 8 - UK name for US-built SCR-545, not taken into service.

Number 4
AA Number 4 was a wide collection of short and medium-range systems known as tactical control radars, whose main purpose was to provide cueing support to the AA Number 3 radars, or "putting on". There were seven entries:

 AA No. 4 Mark 1 - Canadian design rapidly developed from Air-Sea Vessel radar electronics. Widely used with GL Mk. III systems and later. Known in Canada as the Zone Position Indicator, or ZPI.
 AA No. 4 Mark 2 - UK-built versions of the Mark 1.
 AA No. 4 Mark 3 - Similar to Mark 1 and 2, but operating on Airborne Interception radar frequencies. Two sub-versions, (V) which was Vehicle mounted (on a truck) and (P) which was Portable.
 AA No. 4 Mark 4 - UHF set working at 600 MHz, not taken into service.
 AA No. 4 Mark 5 - Expedient development working in the S band, only small numbers used. Also known as "Gorgonzola" due to the shape of its antenna.
 AA No. 4 Mark 6 - Canadian S band development, highly portable. Known in Canada as the Microwave Zone Position Indicator, or MZPI.
 AA No. 4 Mark 7 - UK system similar to the Mark 6 but using a cheese antenna.

Some sources state an early name for the Orange Yeoman was Mark 7, but it is more likely that would have been Mk. 8 or part of Number 5 series.

Number 5
AA Number 5 was assigned to radars similar to Number 4 in concept, but with longer range. These were to be assigned to the Anti-Aircraft Operations Rooms (AAORs) to provide early warning and tactical control over a metropolitan-sized area. There were two entries:

 AA No. 5 Mark 1 - 209 MHz (VHF)
 AA No. 5 Mark 2 - 600 MHz (UHF)

Number 6
AA Number 6 was a special-purpose system dedicated to rangefinding for light anti-aircraft guns, namely the Bofors gun. Short-range AA is a very difficult task to automate because the aircraft appear only for moments, have high crossing speeds, and are often close to the ground so clutter is a significant issue. Number 6 was designed to make a rapid line-of-sight range measurement while pointing the gun was handled manually as before. There were three entries, Mark 1 through 3, differing primarily in detail.

Number 7
AA Number 7 was part of a combined Fire Control System (FCS) for the Bofors guns. It included a rapidly scanning tactical control radar and a separate gun laying radar in a second cabin. The operator of the scanner would select targets, causing the gun laying cabin to slew onto the right bearing. The operator would then find the target, and begin a lock-follow. From then the data from the radar was sent into a predictor in the same cabin as the gun laying radar, which in turn controlled motorized systems on the guns. There were three entries, differing in detail.

References
 

Gun laying radars
Military radars of the United Kingdom
Military equipment introduced from 1940 to 1944